The Khojas are a mainly Nizari Isma'ili Shia community of people originating in Gujarat, India.

Derived from the Persian khwaja, a term of honor, the word Khoja is used to refer to members of Baniya caste groups (Vaishyas), who converted to Islam from Hinduism under Muslim pirs (saints).

In India, most Khojas live in the states of Gujarat, Maharashtra, Rajasthan and the city of Hyderabad. Many Khojas have also migrated and settled over the centuries in East Africa, the Caribbean, Europe and North America. The Khoja were by then adherents of Nizari Isma'ilism. In the late 19th and early 20th centuries, particularly in the aftermath of the Aga Khan Case a significant minority separated and adopted Sunni Islam and Twelver shi'ism, while the majority remained Nizari Isma'ili. In Pakistan, most Khoja live in Karachi in Sindh province.

Etymology
The term Khoja derives from Khwāja (New Persian Khājé), a Persian honorific title (خواجه) of pious individuals used in Turco-Persian influenced regions of the Muslim world.

The specific term Khoja in the Gujarati and Sindhi languages, was first bestowed by the Persianate Nizari Isma'ili Sadardin (died c. 15th century) upon his followers during the lifetime of the Nizari Ismaili Imam Islam Shah (1368-1423 CE). As such, Pir Shihab al-din Shah, brother of one of the Nizari Ismaili imams, wrote regarding the origins of the Khojas that the very formation of the community came about through Pir Sadardin's devotion to the Imam.

Many Lohanas of Gujarat converted to Nizari Ismailism due to the efforts of Pir Sadardin. They gradually used the title Khoja. Before the arrival of the Aga Khan from Persia to British ruled India in the 19th century, Khojas retained many Hindu traditions, including a variation on the belief in the Dashavatara.

History
The Khoja converted from Hinduism to Islam under the influence of pirs. Derived from the Persian khwaja, a term of honour, the word Khoja refers to these Lohana converts to Nizari Ismaili Islam in medieval India (from about the 13th century onward). 

More particularly, it included certain groups such as Charans, predominantly from Gujarat and Kutch, who retained strong Indian ethnic roots and caste customs while sustaining their Muslim religious identity.

In the 19th century, the Ismaili Imamat (office of the Imam) became established in India and a programme of consolidation and reorganisation of the community and its institutions began. These changes led to differences of opinion among Khojas. While the majority of Khojas remained Ismaili, one group became Ithna‘ ashari and a smaller group adopted Sunnism.

In the context of the overall policy of the Ismaili imam of the time, Aga Khan III, of consolidating the Shi‘a Ismaili identity of his followers, the ethnic connotation of being “Khoja” became diluted over time and a wider sense of self-identification as Ismaili Muslims began to emerge. With the increasing recognition of the diversity of the worldwide Ismaili community itself and the positive value of the pluralist heritage represented within each of the traditions, the Khojas now regard themselves as an integral part of the larger Nizari Ismaili community, to whose development they make a strong contribution.

The Khoja Ithna‘ ashari, while seeking to develop relationships with the larger Twelver Shi‘a community, retain their own organisational framework.

The Khojas live today in East Africa, India, Pakistan, Europe, and North America, and show a strong commitment to the values of Muslim philanthropy in their business entrepreneurship and contribution to societies in which they live. From the 18th century, some of the Khojas have migrated to the Persian Gulf region, mainly in the Sultanate of Oman and U.A.E, known as Al-Lawatia.

Khoja communities

Isma'ili Khojas

Originally Nizari Isma'ili, after the 1866 Aga Khan Case that consolidated the bulk of the Bombay Khoja community under the leadership of the Aga Khan. The Khojas credit their title to Pir Sadr al-Din who allegedly laid the foundations for the Nizari Ismaili community in India, even before the Anjudan phase of the history of Nizari Ismailism.

Twelver Khojas
Khojas who follow Twelver Shia Islam and have large communities in Pakistan, India, East Africa, North America and the United Kingdom.
Moulvi Ali Baksh who had settled in Mumbai in the mid-late 1800s was a prominent Moulvi with great respect in Ithna'ashari Khoja community. It is said that then the Shias were organised into a distinct community by Moulvi Ali Baksh himself. (Excerpts as translated from the book Greatness Bygone authored by Ziauddin Ahmed Barni Published by Taleemi Markaz Karachi on 30 July 1961, Page: 342 written on one of 93 great personalities Ali Mohammed Moulvi. The author had not met only 2 of the 93 personalities noted in his book).

Twelver Khojas are said to have broken away from the Isma'ili Khojas due to their determination to defend their remembrance practices against Aga Khan's efforts to ban them, in order to elevate his personal status as the reincarnation of Isma'il ibn Ja'far, the seventh Imām of the Isma'ilis.

Sunni Khojas
Some Khojas follow Sunni Islam. Khoja's relating to Sunni sect of Islam are also called as Sheikh, especially in west Punjab now in Pakistan. In fact, Ismaili preachers have been spreading their beliefs among the local communities, in Punjab's Arora, Bhatia, Khatri and Lohana communities.

East Africa 

For hundreds of years, people from South Asia sailed down the coast of East Africa in their sail ships during the North Eastern monsoons. There were young Khojas amongst these early sailors and some of them stayed behind in East Africa and took advantage of opportunities in commerce and trade.

While the new land offered limitless opportunities to the Khojas, the new environment and prevailing influences called for a reorientation.

The Khojas around the 1870s primarily followed Nizari Ismailism. However, a minority rejected the changes of modernity under the guidance of the Imam of that era and revolted. While some were barred from the Jama'at Khana, the Nizari Ismaili place of worship, others abandoned it willingly. Many of these adopted the larger Ithna'ashari branch of Shi'a Islam and were aided by scholars from Iran, hence the origination of an Agha (Persian) community in Zanzibar. Alongside were the Bahranis, Arab Twelver Shi'a from Bahrain, whose inspirations emanated from Kalbe Aly Khan, a minister to Sultan Majid/Bargash. He proved a great influence and helped a minority of Khojas to secede.

Zanzibar had a prosperous Khoja community that enthusiastically embraced this secession. In fact, the Kuwwat Jamaat of Zanzibar became the first-ever Khoja Twelver Shi'a community (jamaat) in the world in 1882 when the Khojas elsewhere including South Asia were still facing opposition to establish their separate identity. There were stirring events and emotions were roused as the dissidents fervently built up their mosque. Initially, the connection between the two Khoja groups persisted for a while and even a couple of dhegs (large pots) used to be dispatched to the Jama'at Khana from the mosque during jaman (feast). Social traditions also prompted the two counterparts to meet each other. Later, partly at the behest of the Nizari Ismaili Imam, restrictions became severe and even family members separated disconnecting ties between each other or the two met in hiding at a secret place.

Kenya also slowly developed a large Shia community, aided by the work of scholars such as Khwaja Muhammad Latif Ansari.

Notable individuals
Muhammad Ali Jinnah, founder of Pakistan
Azim Premji, Indian billionaire and business tycoon; Chairman of Wipro
Alyque Padamsee, Indian theatre personality and advertising professional ('Father of Modern Indian Advertising')
Akbar Padamsee, Indian artist and painter, considered one of the pioneers in modern Indian painting
Raisa Padamsee, Indian actress
Shazahn Padamsee, Indian actress and model
Issa G. Shivji, Author and academic (Tanzania)
Naushad Merali, Founder of Sameer Group (Kenya)
Mohammed Dewji - Founder of MeTL (Tanzania)
Hussain Sajwani, DAMAC, (UAE)
Firoz Kassam - British Businessman
Amir H. Jamal, former Tanzanian Minister of Finance
Salim–Sulaiman - Bollywood Music directors
Yasmin Ratansi - Canadian politician
Mulla Asgarali Jaffer

 Abdulaziz Sachedina - Twelver Shi’a Islamic scholar
 Mahmod Jamal - Justice on the Canadian Supreme Court
 Omar Sachedina - Canadian journalist
 Naheed Nenshi - Canadian politician 
 Salma Lakhani - Canadian politician  
 Amir Bhatia - British businessman and politician 
 Zarina Bhimji - British photographer 
 Halim Dhanidina - American judge and lawyer
 Iman Vellani - Canadian Actress
 Ali Velshi - Canadian Journalist
 House of Habib - Pakistani Business Family
 Abbas Gokal - Pakistani Businessman

See also 
 Nizari Ismaili
 Ismaili Shi`ism
 Twelver Shi`ism
 Khojki
 Momna, Nizari Ismailis from northern Gujarat

References

N.Khouri & J.P.Leite, "The Ismailis of Mozambique. History of a Twofold Migration (late 19th Century-1975)", in E.Morier-Genoud & M.Cahen (eds), Imperial Migrations. Colonial Communities and Diaspora in the Portuguese World, London: Palgrave, 2012

Bibliography
 Azim Malikov, Kinship systems of Xoja groups in Southern Kazakhstan in Anthropology of the Middle East, Volume 12, Issue 2, Winter 2017, pр.78-91
 Azim Malikov, Sacred Lineages in Central Asia: Translocality and Identity in Mobilities, Boundaries, and Travelling Ideas: Rethinking Translocality Beyond Central Asia and the Caucasus edited by Manja Stephan-¬Emmrich and Philipp Schröder (Cambridge: Open Book Publishers), 2018, pp. 121–150
 Azim Malikov, Khoja in Kazakhstan: identity transformations in Max Planck Institute for Social Anthropology Department ‘Integration and Conflict’ Field Notes and research Projects VI CASCA – Centre for Anthropological Studies on Central Asia: Framing the Research, Initial Projects. Eds.: Günther Schlee. Halle/Saale, 2013, pp. 101–107

External links 

 Origin of Khoja Shia Ithna-Asheries
 World Federation of Khoja Shia Ithna Asheri Muslim Communities
 History of the Khoja Shia Ithna-Asheries
 The Institute of Ismaili Studies - Khojas

Khoja Ismailism
Sunni Islam in India
Social groups of India
Muslim communities of India
Muslim communities of Gujarat
Social groups of Pakistan
Social groups of Sindh
Lohana